The 2017 Russian Artistic Gymnastics Championships was held in Kazan, Russia between 1–5 March 2017.

Medalists

References

External links
  Official site

2017 in gymnastics
Artistic Gymnastics Championships
Russian Artistic Gymnastics Championships
March 2017 sports events in Russia